The Anjobony river in Sofia Region is located in northern Madagascar. It drains to the northern coast. Its main affluent is the Bemarivo (Sofia).  near Boriziny (Port Bergé).

It flows into the Sofia River.

References 

Rivers of Madagascar
Rivers of Sofia Region